ICOR may refer to:

Abbreviations

 Incremental capital-output ratio
 Input, Control, Output, Resources, a standard model for the definition of processes related to IDEF0
 Instant centre of rotation
 International Coordination of Revolutionary Parties and Organizations, an association of communist organizations
 UAB ICOR, companies group in Lithuania
 iCOR Impact, Impact Classroom Observation Resource, an educational software designed for classroom observations

See also

 Ichor, a mineral that is the Greek gods' blood
 Organization for Jewish Colonization in Russia (ICOR, IKOR)